This article contains a partial list of Philippine laws.

Sources of Philippine laws

Notes

 *Customs may be considered as supplementary source of law, however, customs which are contrary to law, public order or public policy shall not be countenanced

Abbreviations

Philippine laws have had various nomenclature designations at different periods in the history of the Philippines, as shown in the following table:

Notable laws 

The following table lists Philippine laws which have been mentioned in Wikipedia, or are otherwise notable. Only laws passed by Congress and its preceding bodies are listed here; presidential decrees and other executive issuances which may otherwise carry the force of law are excluded for the purpose of this table.

Lists of laws by year

2020

2019

2018 (10967–11166)

2017 (10925–10966)

2016 (10740–10924)

2015 (10653–10739)

2014 (10635–10652)

2013 (10355–10634)

2012 (10157–10354)

2011 (10148–10156)

2010 (9903–10146)

2009 (9519–9999)

2008 (9496–9518)

2007 (9366–9495)

2006 (9342–9365)

2005 (9335–9341)

2004 (9233–9334)

2003 (9183–9232)

2002 (9163–9182)

2001 (8990–9162)

2000 (8759–8989)

1999 (8746–8758)

1998 (8446–8745)

1997 (8248–8445)

1996 (8177–8247)

1995 (7854–8176)

1994 (7667–7853)

1993 (7645-7666)

See also
 Congress of the Philippines (section on Lawmaking)
 Philippine legal codes
 Philippines

References

External links 
The text of many Philippine laws can be found on the following sites: 
 Laws and Issuances at Official Gazette of the Republic of the Philippines
 Republic Acts – House of Representatives of the Philippines
 Philippine Supreme Court E-Library
 ChanRobles Virtual Law Library
 Laws, statutes & codes at ChanRobles Virtual Law Library (new site)
 The Corpus Juris Online Law Library
 The Lawphil Project by Arellano Law Foundation

 
Philippines law-related lists